As Long as There's Music may refer to
"As Long as There's Music" (song), a song by Jule Styne and Sammy Cahn
As Long as There's Music (Charlie Haden and Hampton Hawes album), 1978
As Long as There's Music (Cedar Walton album), 1993